The 2020–21 season was the fourth season of competitive football played by Jamshedpur.

Background
In August 2020, Jamshedpur announced Owen Coyle as their new head coach, signing a two-year deal. Coyle retained David Grande and Aitor Monroy at the helm.

First-team squad

Pre-season and friendlies

Competitions

Overview

Indian Super League

League table

Results summary

Results by matchday

Matches

Statistics

Goal scorers

Clean sheets

See also
 2020–21 in Indian football
 Jamshedpur FC

Notes

References

Jamshedpur FC seasons
2020–21 Indian Super League season by team